Antti Mäkilä is a Finnish professional ice hockey forward who currently plays for Ässät of the SM-liiga.

Career statistics

References

External links

1989 births
Living people
Ässät players
Finnish ice hockey forwards
KooKoo players
Lempäälän Kisa players
Oulun Kärpät players
Sportspeople from Pori